Francis Watt (16 February 1866 – 29 August 1951)  was a Scottish footballer who played primarily for hometown club Kilbirnie, as well as short spells with Queen's Park, Clydesdale Harriers, Third Lanark (he was listed as a player at that club when selected for the Glasgow FA team in 1888) and Rangers, with his status as an amateur allowing him to move fairly freely between clubs.

An outside right, Watt scored three goals in four international appearances for Scotland, all while a Kilbirnie player (he was the only player from the Ayrshire club to be capped).

References

Sources

External links

London Hearts profile

1866 births
Footballers from North Ayrshire
1951 deaths
Scottish footballers
Scotland international footballers
Scottish Football League players
Association football outside forwards
Queen's Park F.C. players
Rangers F.C. players
Third Lanark A.C. players
People from Kilbirnie